Presidents of the American Football Coaches Association are:

According to AFCA tradition officers move up one office each year until becoming president.

Notes

References